Oliver Marach and Alexander Peya were the defending champions but Peya decided not to participate.
Marach played alongside Daniele Bracciali but they lost in the first round to Jerzy Janowicz and Albert Ramos.
Colin Fleming and Bruno Soares won the title, defeating Johan Brunström and Frederik Nielsen in the final, 7–6(7–1), 7–6(7–2).

Seeds

Draw

Draw

References
 Main Draw

2013 Heineken Open